Clifty Creek may refer to:

Clifty Creek (Big Berger Creek), a stream in Missouri
Clifty Creek (North Fork River), a stream in Missouri

See also
Clifty Fork